Verconia closeorum is a species of colourful sea slug, a dorid nudibranch, a shell-less marine gastropod mollusk in the family Chromodorididae.

Distribution 
This marine species is endemic to Australia and occurs off South Australia, Tasmania and Victoria

Description

Ecology

References

  Burn R. (2006) A checklist and bibliography of the Opisthobranchia (Mollusca: Gastropoda) of Victoria and the Bass Strait area, south-eastern Australia. Museum Victoria Science Reports 10:1–42

Chromodorididae
Gastropods of Australia
Gastropods described in 1986